Several ships of the Swedish Navy have been named HSwMS Sjölejonet, named after the sea lion:

  was a  launched in 1936
  was a  launched in 1967 and sold to Singapore in the 1990s

Swedish Navy ship names